The Arch of Constantine is a triumphal arch in Rome dedicated to the emperor Constantine the Great. The arch was commissioned by the Roman Senate to commemorate Constantine's victory over Maxentius at the Battle of Milvian Bridge in AD 312. Situated between the Colosseum and the Palatine Hill, the arch spans the Via Triumphalis, the route taken by victorious military leaders when they entered the city in a triumphal procession. The arch is constructed of brick-faced concrete covered in marble.

The three bay design with detached columns was first used for the Arch of Septimius Severus in the Roman Forum (which stands at the end of the triumph route) and repeated in several other arches now lost.

Though dedicated to Constantine, much of the sculptural decoration consists of reliefs and statues removed from earlier triumphal monuments dedicated to Trajan (98–117), Hadrian (117–138) and Marcus Aurelius (161–180), with the portrait heads replaced with his own.

History 

The arch, which was constructed between 312 and 315, was dedicated by the Senate to commemorate ten years (a decennia) of Constantine's reign (306–337) and his victory over the then reigning emperor Maxentius (306–312) at the Battle of Milvian Bridge on 28 October 312, as described on its attic inscription, and officially opened on 25 July 315. Not only did the Roman senate give the arch for Constantine's victory, they also were celebrating decennalia: a series of games that happened every decade during the Roman Empire. On these occasions they also said many prayers and renewed both spiritual and mundane vows. However, Constantine had actually entered Rome on 29 October 312, amidst great rejoicing, and the Senate then commissioned the monument. Constantine then left Rome within two months and did not return until 326.

The location, between the Palatine Hill and the Caelian Hill, spanned the ancient route of Roman triumphs (Via triumphalis) at its origin, where it diverged from the Via sacra. This route was that taken by the emperors when they entered the city in triumph. This route started at the Campus Martius, led through the Circus Maximus, and around the Palatine Hill; immediately after the Arch of Constantine, the procession would turn left at the Meta Sudans and march along the Via sacra to the Forum Romanum and on to the Capitoline Hill, passing through both the Arches of Titus and Septimius Severus.

During the Middle Ages, the Arch of Constantine was incorporated into one of the family strongholds of ancient Rome, as shown in the painting by Herman van Swanevelt, here. Works of restoration were first carried out in the 18th century,  the last excavations have taken place in the late 1990s, just before the Great Jubilee of 2000. The arch served as the finish line for the marathon athletic event for the 1960 Summer Olympics.

Controversy 
There has been much controversy over the origins of the arch, with some scholars claiming that it should no longer be referred to as Constantine's arch, but is in fact an earlier work from the time of Hadrian, reworked during Constantine's reign, or at least the lower part. Another theory holds that it was erected, or at least started, by Maxentius, and one scholar believed it was as early as the time of Domitian (81–96).

Symbolism 
Whatever the faults of Maxentius, his reputation in Rome was influenced by his contributions to public building. By the time of his accession in 306 Rome was becoming increasingly irrelevant to the governance of the empire, most emperors choosing to live elsewhere and focusing on defending the fragile boundaries, where they frequently founded new cities. 

These factors contributed to Maxentius' ability to seize power. In contrast to his predecessors, Maxentius concentrated on restoring the capital; his epithet was conservator urbis suae (preserver of his city). Thus, Constantine was perceived as the deposer of one of the city's greatest benefactors, and needed to acquire legitimacy. Much controversy has surrounded the patronage of the public works of this period. Issuing a damnatio memoriae, Constantine set out to systematically erase the memory of Maxentius. Consequently, there remains considerable uncertainty regarding the patronage of early fourth century public buildings, including the Arch of Constantine, which may originally have been an Arch of Maxentius.

Sculptural style

Constantine's Arch is an important example, frequently cited in surveys of art history, of the stylistic changes of the 4th century, and the "collapse of the classical Greek canon of forms during the late Roman period", a sign the city was in decline, and would soon be eclipsed by Constantine's founding of a new capital at Constantinople in 324. The contrast between the styles of the re-used Imperial reliefs of Trajan, Hadrian and Marcus Aurelius and those newly made for the arch is dramatic and, according to Ernst Kitzinger, "violent", that where the head of an earlier emperor was replaced by that of Constantine the artist was still able to achieve a "soft, delicate rendering of the face of Constantine" that was "a far cry from the dominant style of the workshop". It remains the most impressive surviving civic monument from Rome in Late Antiquity, but is also one of the most controversial with regards to its origins and meanings.

Kitzinger compares a roundel of Hadrian lion-hunting, which is "still rooted firmly in the tradition of late Hellenistic art", and there is "an illusion of open, airy space in which figures move freely and with relaxed self-assurance" with the later frieze where the figures are "pressed, trapped, as it were, between two imaginary planes and so tightly packed within the frame as to lack all freedom of movement in any direction", with "gestures that are "jerky, overemphatic and uncoordinated with the rest of the body". In the 4th century reliefs, the figures are disposed geometrically in a pattern that "makes sense only in relation to the spectator", in the largesse scene (below) centred on the emperor who looks directly out to the viewer.  Kitzinger continues: "Gone too is the classical canon of proportions. Heads are disproportionately large, trunks square, legs stubby ... "Differences in the physical size of figures drastically underline differences of rank and importance which the second-century artist had indicated by subtle compositional means within a seemingly casual grouping. Gone, finally are elaboration of detail and differentiation of surface texture. Faces are cut rather than modeled, hair takes the form of a cap with some superficial stippling, drapery folds are summarily indicated by deeply drilled lines."

The commission was clearly highly important, if hurried, and the work must be considered as reflecting the best available craftsmanship in Rome at the time; the same workshop was probably responsible for a number of surviving sarcophagi.  The question of how to account for what may seem a decline in both style and execution has generated a vast amount of discussion.  Factors introduced into the discussion include: a breakdown of the transmission in artistic skills due to the political and economic disruption of the Crisis of the Third Century,influence from Eastern and other pre-classical regional styles from around the Empire (a view promoted by Josef Strzygowski (1862–1941), and now mostly discounted), the emergence into high-status public art of a simpler "popular" or "Italic" style that had been used by the less wealthy throughout the reign of Greek models, an active ideological turning against what classical styles had come to represent, and a deliberate preference for seeing the world simply and exploiting the expressive possibilities that a simpler style gave. The sculptors of Constantine's time were more interested in symbolism: both symbolism for religion as well as symbolism for history. One factor that cannot be responsible, as the date and origin of the Venice Portrait of the Four Tetrarchs show, is the rise of Christianity to official support, as the changes predated that.

The stylistic references to the earlier arches of Titus and Septimius Severus, together with the incorporation of spolia from the times of other earlier emperors may be considered a deliberate tribute to Roman history.

Iconography
The arch is heavily decorated with parts of older monuments, which assume a new meaning in the context of the Constantinian building. As it celebrates the victory of Constantine, the new "historic" friezes illustrating his campaign in Italy convey the central meaning: the praise of the emperor, both in battle and in his civilian duties. The other imagery supports this purpose: decoration taken from the "golden times" of the Empire under the 2nd century emperors whose reliefs were re-used  places Constantine next to these "good emperors", and the content of the pieces evokes images of the victorious and pious ruler.

Another explanation given for the re-use is the short time between the start of construction (late 312 at the earliest) and the dedication (summer 315), so the architects used existing artwork to make up for the lack of time to create new art. It could be that so many old parts were used because the builders themselves did not feel the artists of their time could do better than what had already been done by different people. As yet another possible reason, it has often been suggested that the Romans of the 4th century truly did lack the artistic skill to produce acceptable artwork, and were aware of it, and therefore plundered the ancient buildings to adorn their contemporary monuments. This interpretation has become less prominent in more recent times, as the art of Late Antiquity has been appreciated in its own right. It is possible that a combination of those explanations is correct.

Attic

On the top of each column, large sculptures representing Dacians can be seen, which date from Trajan. Above the central archway is the inscription, forming the most prominent portion of the attic and is identical on both sides of the arch. Flanking the inscription on both sides are four pairs of relief panels above the minor archways, eight in total. These were taken from an unknown monument erected in honour of Marcus Aurelius. On the north side, from left to right, the panels depict the emperor's return to Rome after the campaign (adventus), the emperor leaving the city and saluted by a personification of the Via Flaminia, the emperor distributing money among the people (largitio), and the emperor interrogating a German prisoner. On the south side, from left to right, are depicted a captured enemy chieftain led before the emperor, a similar scene with other prisoners (illustrated below), the emperor speaking to the troops (adlocutio), and the emperor sacrificing a pig, sheep and bull (suovetaurilia). Together with three panels now in the Capitoline Museum, the reliefs were probably taken from a triumphal monument commemorating Marcus Aurelius' war against the Marcomanni and the Sarmatians from 169–175, which ended with Marcus Aurelius' triumphant return in 176. On the largitio panel, the figure of Marcus Aurelius' son Commodus has been eradicated following the latter's damnatio memoriae.

From the same time period the two large (3 m high) panels decorating the attic on the east and west sides of the arch show scenes from Trajan's Dacian Wars. Together with the two reliefs on the inside of the central archway, these came from a large frieze celebrating the Dacian victory. The original place of this frieze was either the Forum of Trajan, or the barracks of the emperor's horse guard on the Caelius.

Main section
The general layout of the main facade is identical on both sides of the arch, consisting of four columns on bases, dividing the structure into a central arch and two lateral arches, the latter being surmounted by two round reliefs over a horizontal frieze. The four columns are of Corinthian order made of Numidian yellow marble (giallo antico), one of which has been transferred into the Basilica di San Giovanni in Laterano and was replaced by a white marble column. The columns stand on bases (plinths or socles), decorated on three sides. The reliefs on the front show Victoria, either inscribing a shield or holding palm branches, while those to the side show captured barbarians alone or with Roman soldiers. Though Constantinian, they are modelled on those of the Arch of Septimius Severus (and the destroyed Arcus novus), and may be considered as a "standard" item.

The pairs of round reliefs above each lateral archway date to the times of Emperor Hadrian. They display scenes of hunting and sacrificing: (north side, left to right) hunt of a boar, sacrifice to Apollo, hunt of a lion, sacrifice to Hercules. On the south side, the left pair show the departure for the hunt (see below) and sacrifice to Silvanus, while those on the right (illustrated on the right) show the hunt of a bear and sacrifice to Diana. The head of the emperor (originally Hadrian) has been reworked in all medallions: on the north side, into Constantine in the hunting scenes and into Licinius or Constantius I in the sacrifice scenes; on the south side, vice versa. The reliefs, c. 2 m in diameter, were framed in porphyry; this framing is only extant on the right side of the northern facade.  Similar medallions, of Constantinian origin, are located on the small sides of the arch; the eastern side shows the Sun rising, on the western side, the Moon. Both are on chariots.

The spandrels of the main archway are decorated with reliefs depicting victory figures with trophies (illustrated below), those of the smaller archways show river gods. Column bases and spandrel reliefs are from the time of Constantine.

Constantinian frieze 

The horizontal frieze below the round reliefs are the main parts from the time of Constantine, running around the monument, one strip above each lateral archway and including the west and east sides of the arch. These "historical" reliefs depict scenes from the Italian campaign of Constantine against Maxentius which was the reason for the construction of the monument. The frieze starts at the western side with the Departure from Milan (Profectio). It continues on the southern, face, with the Siege of Verona (Obsidio) on the left (South west), an event which was of great importance to the war in Northern Italy. On the right (South east) is depicted the Battle of Milvian Bridge (Proelium) with Constantine's army victorious and the enemy drowning in the river Tiber. On the eastern side, Constantine and his army enter Rome (Ingressus); the artist seems to have avoided using imagery of the triumph, as Constantine probably did not want to be shown triumphant over the Eternal City. On the northern face, looking towards the city, are two strips with the emperor's actions after taking possession of Rome. On the left (North east) is Constantine speaking to the citizens on the Forum Romanum (Oratio), while to the right (North west) is the final panel with Constantine distributing money to the people (Liberalitas).

Inner sides of the archways
In the central archway, there is one large panel of Trajan's Dacian War on each wall. Inside the lateral archways are eight portraits busts (two on each wall), destroyed to such an extent that it is no longer possible to identify them.

Inscriptions
The main inscription on the attic would originally have been of bronze letters. It can still be read easily; only the recesses in which the letters sat, and their attachment holes, remain. It reads thus, identically on both sides (with abbreviations completed in parentheses): 

To the Emperor Caesar Flavius Constantinus, the greatest, pious, and blessed Augustus: because he, inspired by the divine, and by the greatness of his mind, has delivered the state from the tyrant and all of his followers at the same time, with his army and just force of arms, the Senate and People of Rome have dedicated this arch, decorated with triumphs.

The words instinctu divinitatis ("inspired by the divine") have been greatly commented on. They are usually read as sign of Constantine's shifting religious affiliation: The Christian tradition, most notably Lactantius and Eusebius of Caesarea, relate the story of a vision of God to Constantine during the campaign, and that he was victorious in the sign of the cross at the Milvian Bridge. The official documents (esp. coins) still prominently display the Sun god until 324, while Constantine started to support the Christian church from 312 on. In this situation,  the vague wording of the inscription can be seen as the attempt to please all possible readers, being deliberately ambiguous, and acceptable to both pagans and Christians.
As was customary, the vanquished enemy is not mentioned by name, but only referred to as "the tyrant", drawing on the notion of the rightful killing of a tyrannical ruler; together with the image of the "just war", it serves as justification of Constantine's civil war against Maxentius.

Two short inscriptions on the inside of the central archway transport a similar message: Constantine came not as conqueror, but freed Rome from occupation:
 (liberator of the city) —  (founder of peace)

Over each of the small archways, inscriptions read:

They give a hint on the date of the arch: "Solemn vows for the 10th anniversary – for the 20th anniversary" and "as for the 10th, so for the 20th anniversary". Both refer to Constantine's decennalia, i.e. the 10th anniversary of his reign (counted from 306), which he celebrated in Rome in the summer of 315. It can be assumed that the arch honouring his victory was inaugurated during his stay in the city.

Works modeled on, or inspired by, the Arch of Constantine

Bond University, Gold Coast, Australia (1989)
Brandenburg Gate, Potsdam, Prussia (1770)
Arc de Triomphe du Carrousel, Paris, France (1806)
Marble Arch, London, England (1828)
Siegestor, Munich, Germany
Arcade du Cinquantenaire, Brussels, Belgium (1905)
Union Station, Washington, D.C., USA (1908)
American Museum of Natural History (Central Park West facade), New York City, USA (1936)
Kedleston Hall, Derbyshire, UK
Facade of Church of Saint-Denis, Paris, France
Arch of triumph, Pyongyang, North Korea
Pitzhanger Manor, Ealing, London, United Kingdom.

See also 

List of Roman triumphal arches
List of ancient monuments in Rome

Notes

Citations

References 
 
 
 
 
 
 
 
 
 
 
 
 Review: Art Bulletin 1979

Further reading

Books 

 Bonamente, Giorgio (ed.) 1992. Costantino il Grande dall'Antichità all'Umanesimo; Atti del 2. colloquio sul Cristianesimo nel mondo antico, Università di Macerata, 18-20 dicembre 1990  
 
 
 
 
 
 
 
 
 Contents

Articles and chapters
 
 
 
 
  (Full text available on line)
  in 
 Patrizio Pensabene (1992). Il reimpiego nell'età costantiniana a Roma, in Bonamente, Giorgio 1992 Pt. 2 p. 749-768

External links
1960 Summer Olympics official report. Volume 1. p. 80.
1960 Summer Olympics official report. Volume 2, Part 1. p. 118.
The Arch of Constantine, a detailed article "for scholars and enthusiasts"
Inscriptions illustrated and discussed
Google Maps satellite image
Guided tour of the Arch of Constantine on Roma Interactive
High-resolution 360° Panoramas and Images of Arch of Constantine | Art Atlas

Constantine
Cultural depictions of Constantine the Great
Rome R. XIX Celio
315 establishments
Buildings and structures completed in the 4th century
4th-century Roman sculptures
4th-century inscriptions
Venues of the 1960 Summer Olympics
Olympic athletics venues
Terminating vistas
Roman sculpture portraits of emperors